Lev Naumovich Sverdlin (16 November 1901 - 29 August 1969) was a Soviet and Russian actor. He appeared in more than forty films from 1936 to 1969.

Filmography

References

External links 

1901 births
1969 deaths
Burials at Novodevichy Cemetery
Russian male film actors